Konstantinos Banousis (born 23 January 1988) is a Greek footballer who plays as a midfielder for P.S. «I Sparti».

Career
He began his career from the youth team of AEL, and in 2009 he was given on loan to Haidari and in the next season to Pyrsos Grevena. He has also played for Eordaikos 2007, and for Oikonomos Tsaritsani, (teams of lower National Categories), until 6 August 2012, when he made the major step to Greek Super League signing for OFI. He competed with the Cretan club for almost 2,5 years. After the dissolution of the team due to major financial problems, he freed himself from his professional contract and on 20 January 2015 he signed with AEL.

References

External links
 
 Onsports Profile
 myplayer
 aelole goal Vs Platanias (Video)

1988 births
Living people
Greek footballers
Greek expatriate footballers
Athlitiki Enosi Larissa F.C. players
Chaidari F.C. players
Pyrsos Grevena F.C. players
Eordaikos 2007 F.C. players
OFI Crete F.C. players
A.E. Sparta P.A.E. players
Ermis Aradippou FC players
Super League Greece players
Football League (Greece) players
Cypriot First Division players
Greek expatriate sportspeople in Cyprus
Expatriate footballers in Cyprus
Association football midfielders
People from Elassona
Footballers from Thessaly